Galaxias supremus, the Kosciuszko galaxias, is a galaxiid of the genus Galaxias, a member of the Mountain Galaxias species complex group of freshwater fish, found in Australia.

Description
Similar to other member of genus Galaxias.  Mouth is set low on the relatively long snout and dorsal, pelvic and anal fins are well back along the body.  Caudal peduncle short and shallow with the tail fin long at about 20% longer than the caudal peduncle.  Dorsal and anal fins short with the anal fin set well back at about 85% from the front of the dorsal fin, the furthest back of all members of the species complex.  Maximum recorded length , commonly .

Light brown to tan over body and head and generally lighter below the lateral line with the belly even lighter.  Base colour overlain by medium to large darker, uneven blotches mostly joining together to form irregular bands, sometimes also overlain with a shading of tiny, closely packed dark grey spots.   Occasionally very small black bars are present mixed in with the blotches and spots around the mid body.  Gill covers light brown with a medium sized gold patch.  Eye small with a golden iris.  A thin band of gold spots sometime present on the upper surface between the nape and the dorsal fin.  Head covered with a scattering of diffuse gold flecks and the body from behind the pectoral fins to the caudal peduncle has a band of gold to coppery spots concentrated mostly below the lateral line and towards the rear of the fish.

Distribution

Changes to the historical distribution are unknown but the presence of alien trout in the upper reaches of the Snowy River and within 2 km of the Blue Lake system is considered to be a restricting factor on G. supremus'''s range.

Habitat
The Kosciusko Galaxias'' is found in cold water in small clear streams and one on-stream lake (Blue Lake). Stream beds consist of bedrock and boulder, through to gavel and sand, the lake bed consists of pebble, gravel and silt. Able to withstand very cold water below  for lengthy periods. All these waters are covered with snow and ice for long periods of time during winter. Fish have been collected mainly from pools in streams amongst rock, undercut banks and overhanging grasses. In the lake, fish were collected from rocks and small cobble within  of the shore. The species' location and habitat in deeper waters of the lake is unknown.

Lifecycle/Reproduction
Confined to freshwater, with an unknown spawning period likely to be late spring to early summer.  Adult fish collected in mid March were found to have mid stage gonad development.

Conservation
Critically endangered.

Utility to humans
Not an angling target due to small size and conservation status.

References

Galaxias
Taxa named by Tarmo Ain Raadik
Fish described in 2014
Freshwater fish of Australia